Fabrício Lopes Alcântara (born May 18, 1984 in Salvador, Bahia, Brazil) is a Brazilian football defender who is currently a free agent.

Personal 
Fábricio Lopes has two brothers, they are both professional footballers, for his older brother, Fábio Lopes, who was playing for Hong Kong First Division clubs Happy Valley and Eastern. Also Fabrício was a teammate with Fábio for Hong Kong First Division club Happy Valley during 2006–07. Fábio is currently plays for Hong Kong Premier League club Yuen Long. His younger brother, Fernando Lopes, is also currently his teammate at Rangers (HKG).

Position 
Fabricio Lopes can plays as defensive midfielder or central defender.

Honours

Club
With Happy Valley
Hong Kong First Division League: 2005–06

Notes and references

External links
 Profile at lpfp.pt
 CBF Database
 Profile at naval1demaio.com
Fabrício Lopes Alcântara at HKFA

1984 births
Living people
Sportspeople from Salvador, Bahia
Brazilian footballers
Association football defenders
Ittihad FC players
Al Ain FC players
Happy Valley AA players
Associação Naval 1º de Maio players
Shatin SA players
América Futebol Clube (MG) players
Sampaio Corrêa Futebol Clube players
Vasas SC players
Hong Kong Rangers FC players
Primeira Liga players
Hong Kong First Division League players
Brazilian expatriate footballers
Expatriate footballers in the United Arab Emirates
Expatriate footballers in Saudi Arabia
Expatriate footballers in Hong Kong
Expatriate footballers in Portugal
Expatriate footballers in Hungary
Brazilian expatriate sportspeople in the United Arab Emirates
Brazilian expatriate sportspeople in Saudi Arabia
Brazilian expatriate sportspeople in Hong Kong
Brazilian expatriate sportspeople in Portugal
Brazilian expatriate sportspeople in Hungary
UAE Pro League players
Saudi Professional League players